Udea lutealis is a species of moth of the family Crambidae described by Jacob Hübner in 1809.

Description
Udea lutealis has a wingspan of 23–26 mm. Forewings are pale creamy or yellow ocher with darker undulating cross. The hindwings are light gray to whitish on the underside, while the body is whitish. These moths fly at night from June to August depending on the location, in one generation. 

The larvae are polyphagous, feeding on various herbaceous plants, mainly Rubus, Centaurea, Plantago, Cirsium and Artemisia.

Distribution
Udea lutealis is present in most of Europe.

Habitat
This species prefers humid areas such as fresh meadows, clearings, forest roads, etc.

References

External links
 Lepiforum.de

Lutealis
Moths of Europe
Moths of Asia
Moths described in 1809